

References
  (Lysine)
  (DL-Lysine)
  (L-Lysine)

Chemical data pages
Chemical data pages cleanup